Now Autumn 2008 is a compilation CD released by EMI Music Australia in 2008. It is the 20th CD in the Australian Now! series.

"This Heart Attack" by Faker was previously featured on Now Summer 2008.

Track listing
The Veronicas – "Untouched" (4:14)
The Last Goodnight – "Pictures of You" (3:10)
The Potbelleez – "Don't Hold Back" (3:27)
Kylie Minogue – "Wow" (3:12)
Simple Plan – "When I'm Gone" (3:48)
Ida Corr vs. Fedde le Grand – "Let Me Think About It" (2:31)
Faker – "This Heart Attack" (3:48)
Lupe Fiasco featuring Matthew Santos – "Superstar" (4:49)
Missy Higgins – "100 Round the Bends" (2:59)
Silverchair – "Mind Reader" (3:07)
Operator Please – "Leave It Alone" (3:33)
Plain White T's – "Our Time Now" (2:48)
Kisschasy – "Strings and Drums" (3:13)
John Butler Trio – "Used to Get High" (4:29)
Gyroscope – "1981" (3:38)
Scribe featuring Tyra Hammond – "Say It Again" (4:21)
Hot Chip – "Ready for the Floor" (3:53)
Seal – "Amazing" (Thin White Duke Edit) (3:28)
Moby – "Disco Lies" (3:23)
 Se:Sa – "Like This Like That" (3:35)
David Guetta featuring Cozi – "Baby When the Light" (3:27)
Basshunter featuring DJ Mental Theo's Bazzheadz – "Now You're Gone" (2:29)

References

External links
NOW Autumn 2008 @ Australian Charts

2008 compilation albums
EMI Records compilation albums
Now That's What I Call Music! albums (Australian series)